Patrick Birocheau (born 23 September 1955) is a French former table tennis player. He won a bronze medal at the 1981 World Championships in doubles, as well as several medals at the European Championships throughout the 1980s.

He represented his country at the 1988 Summer Olympics in Seoul. In the singles competition, Birocheau was eliminated in the group phase after winning three of his seven matches. He teamed up with future World Champion Jean-Philippe Gatien in the doubles competition, but they were similarly eliminated after winning four of their seven matches.

In addition to his international success, Birocheau won eleven gold medals at the French National Championships: one in singles (1976), nine in doubles (1973–76, 1978, 1979, 1982, 1987, 1988), and one in mixed doubles (1983).

He later served as head coach of the French national team.

See also
 List of table tennis players
 List of World Table Tennis Championships medalists

References

External links
 

Living people
1955 births
French male table tennis players
Table tennis players at the 1988 Summer Olympics
Olympic table tennis players of France
Sportspeople from Béjaïa
World Table Tennis Championships medalists
21st-century Algerian people